The Bochner–Riesz mean is a summability method often used in harmonic analysis when considering convergence of Fourier series and Fourier integrals. It was introduced by Salomon Bochner as a modification of the Riesz mean.

Definition
Define

Then the Bochner–Riesz means of complex order ,  of (where  and ) are defined as

Application to convolution operators
As such, in these cases, considering the almost everywhere convergence of Bochner–Riesz means for functions in  spaces is much simpler than the problem of "regular" almost everywhere convergence of Fourier series/integrals (corresponding to ). 

In higher dimensions, the convolution kernels become "worse behaved": specifically, for 

the kernel is no longer integrable. Here, establishing almost everywhere convergence becomes correspondingly more difficult.

Bochner–Riesz conjecture
This was shown in a paper of 1971 by Charles Fefferman. 

Define , the "critical index", as

.

Then the Bochner–Riesz conjecture states that

is the necessary and sufficient condition for a  bounded Fourier multiplier operator. It is known that the condition is necessary.

References

Further reading

Means
Summability methods